Aldwyn, Aldwin or Aldwine may refer to:

Saint Aldwyn, abbot of Partney Abbey in Lincolnshire, England, during the 7th century

Aldwyn of Malvern, historical founder of Great Malvern Priory, in Malvern, Worcestershire in the 11th century

See also
 Aldwin (disambiguation)
 Alduin (disambiguation)